Patrick Sherrard (7 January 1919 – 11 January 1997) was an English cricketer.  Sherrard was a right-handed batsman.  He was born at Mickleover, Derbyshire and educated at Stowe School.

Sherrard made a single first-class appearance for Cambridge University against Northamptonshire at Fenner's in 1938.  In this match, he scored 5 runs in the university's first-innings, before being dismissed by Eric Herbert, while in their second-innings he was dismissed by Reginald Partridge for 2 runs.  The match ended in a draw.  In that same season he also made a single first-class appearance for Leicestershire against Oxford University at the University Parks.  In Leicestershire's first-innings, he scored 53 runs before being dismissed by Peter Whitehouse.  This was his only innings of the match, which ended in a draw.

Following World War II, Sherrard made a single appearance for Berkshire against Hertfordshire in the 1946 Minor Counties Championship.  He died at Exeter, Devon on 11 January 1997.

References

External links
Patrick Sherrard at ESPNcricinfo
Patrick Sherrard at CricketArchive

1919 births
1997 deaths
Cricketers from Derby
People educated at Stowe School
Alumni of the University of Cambridge
English cricketers
Cambridge University cricketers
Leicestershire cricketers
Berkshire cricketers
People from Mickleover